Mayo West or West Mayo may refer to one of two parliamentary constituencies in County Mayo, Ireland:
Mayo West (Dáil constituency) (1969–1997)
West Mayo (UK Parliament constituency) (1885–1922)

See also
County Mayo